Nancy Campbell is a British poet, non-fiction writer and publisher of artist's books. Her first collection of poetry, Disko Bay (2015), was shortlisted for the Forward Prize for Best First Collection. Other works include The Library of Ice (2018) and Fifty Words for Snow (2020). In 2018, she was appointed Canal Laureate by the Poetry Society and the Canal & River Trust.

Early life and education 
Campbell was born in Exeter and grew up in the Scottish Borders and Northumberland. She studied English Literature at the University of Oxford from 1996-9 before training in letterpress printing and typefounding at Barbarian Press, Woodside Press, The New York Center for Book Arts, Book Works and Alembic Press.

Residencies and fellowships 

 2010 Upernavik Museum, Greenland: Writer in Residence
 2012 Doverodde Book Arts Festival, Denmark: Writer in Residence
 2012 Síldarminjasafn (Herring Era Museum), Siglufjörður, Iceland: Writer in Residence 
 2013 Words Across Northumberland, UK: Writer in Residence
 2013-14 Lady Margaret Hall, University of Oxford: Visual and Performing Artist in Residence 
 2015 Herhusið, Iceland: Writer in Residence 
 2015 Ilulissat Kunstmuseum, Greenland: Writer in Residence

Published works 

 How to Say 'I Love You' in Greenlandic, Bird Editions, 2011
 Doverrode: Twenty Days in Denmark, Bird Editions, 2012
 ITOQQIPPOQ, Bird Editions, 2014
 Vantar | Missing, Bird Editions, 2014, 
 Disko Bay, Enitharmon Editions, 2015,  - shortlisted for the Forward Prize for Best First Collection.
 Death of a Foster Son, Bird Editions, 2016, 
 The Polar Tombola: A Book of Banished Words, Bird Editions, 2017, 
 The Library of Ice: Readings from a Cold Climate, Simon and Schuster, 2018,  - longlisted for the Rathbones Folio Prize.
 Navigations, Happenstance Press, 2020, 
 Fifty Words for Snow, Elliot & Thompson Ltd, 2020, ISBN 978-1783964987

References 

1978 births
Living people
21st-century British poets
British women poets